Enzo Gambaro (born 23 February 1966 in Genoa, Italy) is an Italian former professional footballer who played as a defender.

Gambaro was a part of the Parma team that won promotion to Serie A, and played for Sampdoria before joining A.C. Milan in 1991. He briefly had a stint in England, firstly with Bolton Wanderers and then Grimsby Town, before moving to Austria with Sturm Graz.

Managerial career
On the 16 June 2016 Gambaro was announced new head coach of Milan–based football club Brera.

External links

Gambaro Grimsby statistics.
The Independent- Bolton sign Gambaro

1966 births
Living people
Italian footballers
Italian expatriate footballers
Bolton Wanderers F.C. players
Parma Calcio 1913 players
A.C. Milan players
U.C. Sampdoria players
SK Sturm Graz players
Grimsby Town F.C. players
A.C. Prato players
A.C. Reggiana 1919 players
U.S. Triestina Calcio 1918 players
Serie A players
Serie B players
English Football League players
Austrian Football Bundesliga players
Expatriate footballers in England
Expatriate footballers in Austria

Association football defenders